Tan (Tañ) is a rural locality (a village) in Chalmalinsky Selsoviet, Sharansky District, Bashkortostan, Russia. The population was 16 as of 2010.

Geography 
Tan is located 18 km southwest of Sharan (the district's administrative centre) by road. Dyurmenevo is the nearest rural locality.

References 

Rural localities in Sharansky District